Tai A Chau is an uninhabited island of Hong Kong, part of the Soko Islands group, located south of Lantau Island. It is referred to as South Soko Island in some media articles.

Geography
With an area of 1.2 km², Tai A Chau is the largest of the Soko Islands. It is located 4.5 km to the south of Lantau Island and about 2 km north of the boundary of the Hong Kong territorial waters. The island has small hills with heights ranging from 85m to 154m. Its coastline is mainly steeply sloped and rocky in nature.

Administration
Tai A Chau is a recognized village under the New Territories Small House Policy.

History
There were historically two villages on the island: Ha Tsuen and Sheung Tsuen on the west and south sides of the island. The villagers left in the 1980s, when a detention camp for Vietnamese refugees was built. In 1937, Walter Schofield, then a Cadet Officer in the Hong Kong Civil Service, wrote "There is a shrimp paste factory here which exports to Europe and America".

Tai A Chau Detention Centre was home to thousands of Vietnamese refugees from 1991 to 1996. It once held a peak population of almost 9,700 in November 1991. After the announcement of the closure of Tai A Chau refugee facility on 10 June 1996, the transfer of the remaining Vietnamese refugees took place on 10 consecutive days from 16 to 25 September 1996. Each day, one ferry loaded with luggage, and two ferries loaded with a total of about 550 Vietnamese refugees departed Tai A Chau for HMS Tamar naval base at Stonecutters Island. They were then moved to the notorious Whitehead Detention Centre in Wu Kai Sha, before immigrating to the US under their “Resettlement Opportunity for Vietnamese Returnees Scheme”. This ensured the centre was closed just prior to the handover in 1997 and all the building structures were demolished.

In February 2023 the Hong Kong Police Force carried out a crowd control training exercise on the island, leaving hundreds of spent tear gas grenades and debris from other crowd control weapons on the protected South Lantau Marine Park site.

Features
The island has a temple dedicated to Tin Hau and seven earth shrines.

Two helicopter landing pads and a small jetty remain from the island's former detention centre.

References

Further reading

External links

 Photographs of the Tai A Chau Tin Hau Temple
 Location Plan of Identified Cultural Heritage Resources on Tai A Chau
 More details about Tai A Chau. From EIA-125/2006. Liquefied Natural Gas (LNG) Receiving Terminal and Associated Facilities
 Aerial Photo of Tai A Chau in 1989, showing the Detention Centre.
 Delineation of area of existing village Tai A Chau (South Lantao) for election of resident representative (2019 to 2022)

Islands District
Villages in Islands District, Hong Kong
Islands of Hong Kong
Populated places in Hong Kong